Starblazer Adventures is a role-playing game published by Cubicle 7 in 2008.

History
In 2007 Cubicle 7 Entertainment produced a licensed Starblazer role-playing game using the FATE 3.0 system. The game was released by Cubicle 7 in August 2008, at Gen Con Indianapolis, followed by a hard-cover edition in June 2009. In July 2009 it was nominated for three Ennies.

In 2009 Cubicle 7 released the Starblazer supplement Mindjammer - Starblazer Adventures in the Second Age of Space by Sarah Newton. It won a Judge's Spotlight Award at the 2010 Ennies. A vastly expanded and standalone version of the transhuman setting called Mindjammer - The Roleplaying Game using the Fate Core System was released by Mindjammer Press in 2014.

Cubicle 7 released the licensed tabletop role-playing game called Starblazer Adventures using the Fate system in 2008, with multiple supplements coming out through to 2013. It was shortlisted for multiple awards both at the Indie RPG Awards and the ENnies.

In 2014, Cubicle 7 no longer published or supported the game as their licensing agreement came to an end. As no second edition of the core rulebook was printed since its initial 2008 offering and all PDF material was removed from its online store, it remains out of print.

Description
The FATE system has been licensed to Cubicle 7 Entertainment who used it for Starblazer Adventures, based on the British Starblazer comic.

References

British role-playing games
Cubicle 7 games
Role-playing games based on comics
Role-playing games introduced in 2008
Space opera role-playing games